François Cousteix, better known as Hacker Croll, is a French self-taught cracker who is notable for hacking Twitter in July 2009. He was in close contact with reporters from TechCrunch who published numerous articles about the information obtained and the incident itself. He remained anonymous until his arrest in March 2010.

Attack on Twitter
Croll obtained access to many of Twitter's high-profile executives' numerous Internet accounts. The infiltration was made easy when the targets passwords and usernames were the same for both personal and business accounts. This led to a domino effect whereby all accounts were hacked including their PayPal and iTunes accounts. He obtained over 300 pages of sensitive documents including Twitters financial projections and meeting notes.

TechCrunch reports
TechCrunch first reported the hack which included a screenshot of Twitter founder Evan Williams' Facebook page and speculation as to the true extent of the attack on July 16. It includes a statement by Williams saying "This had nothing to do with the security of twitter.com". Croll, apparently concerned that Twitter had not understood the danger of the attack sent all the documents obtained to TechCrunch, which subsequently published a select section of them. An extensive article describing the details of the attack a few days later after TechCrunch interviewed the Croll.

Letter to Twitter
When asked by TechCrunch if there was a message that he would like to send to Twitter he responded with a note where he encouraged them to be more careful about security.

In English:

Arrest
He was arrested in March 2010 after a joint investigation by the Federal Bureau of Investigation and French police. He was then handed a five-month suspended sentence by the criminal court in Clermont-Ferrand, instead of the two months and €1,000 fine recommended by prosecutors; Croll announced that he would not appeal the sentence.

References

Living people
Hacking (computer security)
Year of birth missing (living people)